Greenback may refer to:

Currency 
 Greenback (1860s money), a fiat currency issued during the American Civil War
Greenback, a nickname used for the United States dollar in the financial press in other countries, or slang for the US paper dollar
 Greenback Party, an American political party active between 1874 and 1884 which advocated non-gold-backed government currency

Fish 
 Greenback cutthroat trout (Oncorhynchus clarki stomias), the easternmost subspecies of cutthroat trout
 Greenback flounder (Rhombosolea tapirina)
 Greenback horse mackerel (Trachurus declivis), a species of jack
 Greenback stingaree (Urolophus viridis)
 An alternate name for the Bar jack (Caranx ruber)

Other uses 
 Greenback, Tennessee, United States, a city
 "Greenbacks", a 1955 song by Ray Charles
 Celestion G-12, guitar cabinet loudspeakers
 Baron Silas Greenback, a fictional villainous toad in Danger Mouse (TV series)
 "Greenbacks" (Once Upon a Time), an episode of the seventh season of Once Upon a Time

ja:紙幣#その他